General Caldwell may refer to:

Frank Merrill Caldwell (1866–1937), U.S. Army brigadier general
Frank Caldwell (British Army officer) (1921–2014), British Army major general
John C. Caldwell (1833–1912), Union Army brevet major general 
William B. Caldwell III (1925–2013), U.S. Army lieutenant general
William B. Caldwell IV (born 1954), U.S. Army lieutenant general, son of William B. Caldwell III

See also
 Frederick Heath-Caldwell (1858–1945), British Army officer and RAF major general
 Attorney General Caldwell (disambiguation)